The Wanton Bishops is a Lebanese rock band formed in Beirut, Lebanon in 2011. The group consists of Nader Mansour (vocals, guitar, harmonica, keyboards) and Eddy Ghossein (guitar, backing vocals, banjo). The duo began as an independent act founded after Mansour and Ghossein met outside a bar in Beirut and eventually bonded over their mutual appreciation for blues music. The Wanton Bishops was eventually formed and emerged among a second wave of popular garage rock revival and are considered today to be one of the leading bands in the Middle East.

After signing with young talent promoters Keeward, the group released its debut EP, Bad Rhyme (2012), which was recorded in Beirut. The record forged the group's raw blues rock sound and earned them a good standing amongst rock crowds in Lebanon. Over the next year, the Wanton Bishops built an underground fanbase through near-constant touring of small clubs, a viral presence on social media, media appearances, and extensive licensing of their songs. The international media eventually caught on to their soaring fame in countries such as France, Turkey and Sweden, and it wasn't long before the band started accumulating international date tours. Today, the band has just completed a tour in Turkey and is scheduled for tours in France, Dubai, and Scandinavia.

Band members
Nader Mansour– vocals, guitar, harmonica, keyboards (2010–present)
Eddy Ghossein – guitar, backing vocals, banjo (2010–2016)

Discography

Albums and EPs
Bad Rhyme - EP (2011) 
"Sleep With the Lights On" 
"Smith & Wesson" 
"Whoopy Intro" 
"Whoopy" 
"Bad Rhyme" 
"Time to Go" 

Sleep with the Lights On - Album (2012) 
 Sleep with the Lights On
 Bad Liver and a Broken heart 
 Oh Wee
 Howl 
 Smith and Wesson
 Time to Go
 Whoopy Intro
 Whoopy 
 My Kinda Lovin'
 Bad Rhyme 
 Bad Rhyme (Trash Inc. Rework)

Nowhere Everywhere - Album (2016) 
 Waslaha
 Hitman 
 I Don't Dance
 Sailing Down
 The Kinda Pain I Love

References

Rock music duos
Lebanese rock music groups
Musical groups established in 2011
2011 establishments in Lebanon